Bertrand Le Gendre (born 25 February 1948, in Neuilly-sur-Seine) is a French journalist and essayist.

Studies 
Private school Institution Notre-Dame de Sainte-Croix (Neuilly-sur-Seine), Institute of Political Studies in Paris, law and sociology degrees (Paris University)

Career 
Journalist in Le Monde: editor in the Education headline (1974-1979), editor then assistant head in the department of General Informations (1979-1983), head of the Justice column (1983-1987), international reporter (1987-1992), Chief Editor (1993-2006), editorialist (2006-2011) 
Visiting Professor at Panthéon-Assas University (2000-2011)
Head (with Edwy Plenel) of "The Topical subject" collection for Gallimard Publisher (1986-1989)
Presenter (with Marc Ferro) of the weekly program "From Current Events to History" on the History Channel (1997-1999)

Published works
 1962, the fantastic year (Denoël, Paris, 2012) 
 Confessions of the n° 2 of the OAS. Talks with Jean-Jacques Susini (Les Arènes, Paris, 2012) 
 Flaubert (Perrin Publisher, "Selfportraits" collection, Paris, 2013) 
 The War of Algeria, the clash of memories (collaboration) (Le Monde, "World History : How to understand a changing world" collection, Paris, 2013) 
 De Gaulle, From Rebel to Head of State (collaboration) (Le Monde, "World History: They changed the world" collection, Paris, 2014) 
 Kennedy, The Man, the President, the Myth  (collaboration) (Le Monde, "World History: They changed the world" collection, Paris, 2015) 
 De Gaulle and Mauriac. The Forgotten Dialogue (Fayard, Paris, 2015) 
Bourguiba, (Fayard, Paris, 2019) 
Crimes et abus sexuels dans l'Eglise. Le cas du curé d'Uruffe. Ce que disent les archives (Amazon Kindle, 2021)

References

1948 births
21st-century French writers
French journalists
Living people
French male non-fiction writers